Marc A. Spilker is an American financial executive and investor. He is a Founding Member of GPS Investment Partners, LLC and the Executive Chairman of Merchant Investment Management, LLC.

Life and career

A native of Long Island, New York, Spilker is a 1982 graduate of W.C. Mepham High School. He received a BS in Economics from the Wharton School of the University of Pennsylvania in 1986.

Spilker started his career at O'Connor & Associates. In 2010, Spilker retired from Goldman Sachs following a 20-year career with the firm. At Goldman he served as co-head of the Investment Management Division (IMD) and was also a member of the firmwide Management and Risk Committees.

From 2010 to 2014 Spilker was President of Apollo Global Management and a member of the firm’s Executive Committee. 
Spilker was also the Chairman of Chiron Investment Management, LLC from 2015 to 2020. Marc Spilker is a Founding Member of GPS Investment Partners, LLC and the  Executive Chairman of Merchant Investment Management, LLC.

Personal life

Spilker is married to Diane Isaacs Spilker.

References

External links 
  Home Page
  RFK Award

Living people
1964 births
American chief executives
American financial businesspeople
American investors
American money managers
Apollo Global Management people
Businesspeople from New York City
Goldman Sachs people
Jewish American philanthropists
People from Long Island
Wharton School of the University of Pennsylvania alumni
Philanthropists from New York (state)
21st-century American Jews